Anne-Marie de Backer (1908–1987) was a French poet and translator. She was awarded the Renée Vivien Prize for female poets in 1959.

Works
    Le Vent des rues, Paris, Seghers, Prix Artaud 1952.
    Danse du cygne noir, Paris, Seghers, 1954.
    Les Étoiles de novembre, Préf. de Louis Émié, Paris, Seghers, 1956.
    L'Herbe et le feu, Paris, Seghers, 1958.
    La Dame d'Elche, Paris, Seghers, 1963.
    Étoile Lucifer, Paris, Seghers, 1967.
    Orties aux flammes bleues, 1975.
    Le Soleil du grand vent, Rodez, Subervie, Coll. Le Miroir, 1981.

References
 Jehan Despert, Anne-Marie de Backer, biographie et bibliographie, Rodez, Subervie, Coll. Visages de ce temps, 1976
 Achmy Halley, Anne-Marie de Backer, fille adoptive d’un songe, Montpellier, Presses universitaires de Montpellier, 1992

1908 births
1987 deaths
20th-century French translators
20th-century French poets